"Midnight (The Night I Count the Stars)" (Japanese:  Hoshi wo Kazoeru Yoru; Korean:  Byeol Heneun Bam) is a song released by the South Korean boy band Beast. It was released digitally in South Korea on July 15, 2012 as a pre-release single of the group's fifth mini album Midnight Sun, released a week after. The song was later re-recorded in Japanese and was used as the group's third Japanese single, released on October 17, 2012.

Background
On July 12, Cube Entertainment announced that the song would be released on July 15 as a pre-release single from the upcoming mini album Midnight Sun. On July 15, "Midnight" was released digitally on South Korea music portal sites. On the same day, a theme music video of the song was also released. Although the group used the same system that they used on the album Fiction and Fact, releasing a song as a pre-single one week before its official release, the song was not promoted.

Composition
"Midnight" was written by Yong Jun-hyung, Choi Kyu-sung, and Shinsadong Tiger; Kyu-sung and Tiger were the song's composers.

Music video
The song does not have an official music video, instead Cube Entertainment released a one-minute and sixteen second theme music video. It was released, along with the digital release of the song, on July 15, 2012.  The theme music video features scenes that the group shot in New York City between July 1 and July 7, 2012. Those scenes were also part of the music video for the lead single from Midnight Sun, the song "Beautiful Night".

Track listing
Korean digital single:
 "Midnight" (Byeol Heneun Bam, The Night I Count the Stars) - 3:54

Chart performance
The song debuted at number two on Gaon's weekly singles chart with 43,855,691 points. The song also charted on Gaon's other charts: on the Streaming chart the song peaked at number 5, with 2,214,129 streams in the first week; on the Download chart it peaked at number two with 473,121 downloads in the first week; on the BGM chart it peaked number one; on the Mobile chart it debuted at number ten and peaked at number nine; and in the Karaoke chart it peaked at number eighty-six. The song had better peaks on the charts than Midnight Suns official lead single, "Beautiful Night". This is not the first time that the pre-single charted better than the lead single, it also happened with the singles "On Rainy Days" and "Fiction" from the group's first studio album Fiction and Fact.

Charts

Japanese version

Two weeks after announcing the Japanese release of the EP Midnight Sun, on September 23, Far Eastern Tribe Records, the group's Japanese label, announced that a Japanese re-recorded version of the song "Midnight" would be used as the group's third Japanese single.

Background
The single was released on October 17, 2012 in ten different editions: 3 limited CD+DVD, a regular edition, and six special solo covers editions. All CD+DVD editions came with different features, Type A came with the live special "2011.06.22 Beast Night" Vol. 1 and Vol. 3; Type B came with the Vol. 2 and Vol. 4; and Type C came with the music video of "Midnight" and its 'making-of' video. The regular edition came with the CD single itself. A special solo cover version came with only "Midnight" on the single and with six different jacket covers of every member on them. The CD+DVD and regular editions also included a special random trading card, CD+DVD Type A included a card of Doo-joon or Dong-woon, CD+DVD Type B included a card of Gi-kwang or Jun-hyung, CD+DVD Type C included a card of Yo-seob or Hyun-seung, and the Regular edition a collective card of the members, 1 random from 3 different types. The b-side of the single, a Japanese version of "Biga Oneun Naren", was released the same way as "Midnight" in South Korea, one week after the album's release.

Composition
The Japanese version of the song is a re-recorded version of the Korean version with Japanese lyrics. The b-side is a Japanese version of the song "Biga Oneun Naren", which like "Midnight", was originally recorded in Korean and re-recorded with Japanese lyrics. The original version of the song was written and composed by Choi Kyu-sung. Both songs were translated into Japanese by Rina Moon.

Music video
The music video for the Japanese version of the song premiered on September 27, exclusively on MTV Japan. Cube Entertainment uploaded the video on Beast's YouTube account on September 29.

Track listing
Special solo jacket covers only:
 "Midnight -Hoshi wo Kazoeru Yoru-" (At Night I Count the Stars) (Japanese version) - 3:54

Chart performance

Oricon chart

Release history

References

Cube Entertainment singles
2012 singles
Korean-language songs
Japanese-language songs
Dance-pop songs
Songs written by Shinsadong Tiger
Song recordings produced by Shinsadong Tiger
Highlight (band) songs
2012 songs